Gondia district (also known as Gondiya, Marathi pronunciation: [ɡon̪d̪iaː]) is an administrative district in the state of Maharashtra in India. The district headquarter is located at Gondia. The district is part of Nagpur Division. There are 8 Talukas in Gondia District. Gondia Airport is second airport in Vidharbha region and serves city of Gondia.

Officer

Members of Parliament

Sunil Baburao Mendhe (BJP) 
Ashok Nete (BJP)

Guardian Minister

list of Guardian Minister

District Magistrate/Collector

list of District Magistrate / Collector

Divisions
The district is divided into four sub-divisions, each of which is further divided into talukas. These are:
 Gondia sub-division: Gondia.
 Deori: Deori, Amgaon, and Salekasa talukas
 Tirora sub-division: Tirora and Goregaon talukas
 Arjuni Morgaon sub-division: Arjuni Morgaon and Sadak Arjuni talukas
The district also includes of 556 gram panchayats (village councils), 8 panchayat samitis and 954 revenue village. The Eight municipalities in this district are Gondia, Tirora, Arjuni Morgaon, Deori, Amgaon, Goregaon, Sadak Arjuni, Salekasa.

The district has four Vidhan Sabha (legislative assembly) constituencies: Arjuni Morgaon (Scheduled castes), Gondiya, Tirora and Amgaon (Scheduled tribes). While the first three are part of Bhandara-Gondiya Lok Sabha constituency, the last one is part of Gadchiroli-Chimur (ST) Lok Sabha constituency.

Demographics
According to the 2011 census Gondia district has a population of 1,322,507, roughly equal to the nation of Mauritius or the US state of New Hampshire. This gives it a ranking of 369th in India (out of a total of 640). Its population growth rate during 2001–2011 was 10.13%. Gondiya has a sex ratio of 996 females for every 1,000 males, and a literacy rate of 85.41%. 17.08% of the population lived in urban areas. Scheduled Castes and Scheduled Tribes make up 13.31% and 16.20% of the population respectively.

Languages

At the time of the 2011 Census of India, 73.31% of the population in the district spoke Marathi, 10.06% Hindi, 4.70% Powari, 3.45% Gondi, 2.60% Lodhi and 1.79% Chhattisgarhi as their first language.

Climate 
Gondia experiences extreme variations in temperature with very hot summers and very cold winters and has an average relative humidity of 62 percent.

The hottest month is May when daytime high temperatures will generally average . In recent times the highest-recorded temperature in May has been , and the lowest May temperature has been .

Economy
In 2006 the Ministry of Panchayati Raj named Gondia one of the country's 250 most backward districts (out of a total of 640). It is one of the twelve districts in Maharashtra currently receiving funds from the Backward Regions Grant Fund Programme (BRGF).

References

External links

 Gondia district website
 www.gondiainfo.com

 
Districts of Maharashtra
Nagpur division
1999 establishments in Maharashtra
Vidarbha